"Bamboléo" is a 1987 Spanish language song by Gitano-French band Gipsy Kings, from their eponymous album. The song was written by band members Tonino Baliardo, Chico Bouchikhi (J. Bouchikhi) and Nicolas Reyes. It was arranged by Dominique Perrier. "Bamboleo" could be translated as "wobble" "swing" or "dangle" in Spanish.

The now iconic song has been a worldwide hit for the Gipsy Kings and has since been covered by many artists, both in Spanish and in other languages.

Origin
The word bamboleo means "wobble" "sway" or "dangle" in Spanish. The song's refrain says: "bamboleo, bambolea, porque mi vida yo la prefier* vivir así", which translates to: "Swaying, swaying, because I prefer to live my life this way."

Part of the song is an adaptation of the 1980 Venezuelan folk song "Caballo Viejo" by Simón Díaz. The refrain is based on Bamboleô by André Filho, recorded by Carmen Miranda in 1931.  

Julio Iglesias performed the song as "Caballo Viejo (Bamboleo)".

Track list
1987
A-Side: "Bamboléo" (3:28)
B-Side: "Quiero Saber" (4:09)
1988 12" UK version
A-side: "Bamboléo"
B-side: "Bamboléo (Single Version)" (3:25) / "Quiero Saber" (4:10)
1988 US version
A-side: "Bamboléo" (3:28)
B-side: "Bamboléo (LP version)" (3:28)
1988 long 12" version
A-Side: "Bamboléo (Latin single)" (3:45)
B-side: "Bamboléo (Latin Extended version)" (7:17)

Certifications

On other Gipsy Kings albums
The Gipsy Kings included the song again on their album Greatest Hits as track #3.

The same 1994 album also includes a last track (track #18) that uses the song in a medley of hits as "Bamboléo – Volare – Djobi Djoba – Pida Me La – Baila Me".

Versions
 Celia Cruz also recorded a version of this song.
 Julio Iglesias also recorded a version of this song, which became popular.
 Spanish teen band Gypsy Teens released a revamped recording in 2001.
 Finnish folk metal band Ensiferum used the refrain in a bonus track titled "Bamboleo (Gipsy Kings cover)" on their 2012 album Unsung Heroes.
 Romanian singer WRS released a version in 2022.

Mashups
The  season 3 episode "The Spanish Teacher" of the American television series Glee featured a mashup of "Bamboléo" with Enrique Iglesias's "Hero", titled "Bambolero/Hero". The main vocals were by Chord Overstreet (playing the character Sam Evans on the show).

Samplings
Umboza song "Sunshine", their biggest hit in the UK, is based on a sample of "Bamboléo".

In other media
 The Nintendo Wii version of the 1999 video game Samba de Amigo includes this song as a selection.
 From January 2014-August 2022, "Bamboléo Wednesday" has been a feature on the Scott Mills show on BBC Radio 1, which involves the weekly playing of the song, whilst listeners who are "Bamboleing" text in for shout outs. Short clips of highlights from the show are played in the gap before the first chorus and throughout the song. During the "clappy bit", a clip of former Strictly Come Dancing judge Len Goodman saying "phwoar, smack me with a damp chamois leather will you, this is heaven" or "can we get another dick back there" is played. Prior to his death, a clip of Bruce Forsyth saying "forty of those" whilst slapping his calves was used instead. The song ends with Scott and Chris Stark singing the last few words, and shouting "BLAZIN" in the style of Fuse ODG.
 In 20th Century Fox's 2015 animated film The Peanuts Movie, Snoopy dances to part of the Bamboléo chorus to show Charlie Brown dance moves.
 In Illumination Entertainment's 2016 animated film Sing, Rosita dances to part of Bamboléo at the supermarket. The song also appears on the film's soundtrack.
 In 2021, TikTok users made videos to the song where they're on the run from the police and then pretend to fall over to escape.

References

1987 songs
1987 singles
Gipsy Kings songs
Spanish-language songs
Elektra Records singles